Riddle High School, also known as Riddle Junior/Senior High School is a public high school established in 1935 in Riddle, Oregon, United States. It is a part of Riddle School District and houses students from the 7th to 12th Grade.

Academics
In 2008, 83% of the school's seniors received their high school diploma. Of 35 students, 29 graduated, 5 dropped out, and 1 is still in high school.

References

High schools in Douglas County, Oregon
Public middle schools in Oregon
Public high schools in Oregon